Alexandrine Fanier (1745–1821), was a French stage actress.

She was engaged at the Comédie-Française in 1764. She became a Sociétaires of the Comédie-Française in 1764. She retired in 1786.

She was a successful soubrette.

References 

1745 births
1821 deaths
18th-century French actresses
French stage actresses